Johann Joseph Ignaz von Döllinger (28 February 179914 January 1890), also  Doellinger in English, was a German theologian, Catholic priest and church historian who rejected the dogma of papal infallibility. Among his writings which proved controversial, his criticism of the papacy antagonized ultramontanes, yet his reverence for tradition annoyed the liberals.

He is considered an important contributor to the doctrine, growth and development of the Old Catholic Church, though he himself never joined that denomination.

Early life
Born at Bamberg, Bavaria, Döllinger came from an intellectual family, his grandfather and father having both been eminent physicians and professors of medical science; his mother's family were equally accomplished. Young Döllinger was first educated in the gymnasium at Würzburg, where he acquired a knowledge of Italian. A Benedictine monk taught him English privately. He began to study natural philosophy at the University of Würzburg, where his father now held a professorship. In 1817 he began the study of mental philosophy and philology, and in 1818 turned to the study of theology, which he believed to lie beneath every other science. He also learned Spanish at the university. He particularly devoted himself to an independent study of ecclesiastical history, a subject very indifferently taught in Roman Catholic Germany at that time. In 1820 he became acquainted with Victor Aimé Huber (1800–1869), who influenced him greatly.

Career
After studying at the ecclesiastical seminary in Bamberg, on 5 April 1822 he was ordained a Roman Catholic priest for the Diocese of Bamberg, and in November, was appointed chaplain at Markscheinfeldt in Middle Franconia. In 1823 he became professor of ecclesiastical history and canon law in the lyceum at Aschaffenburg. He then took his doctoral degree, and in 1826 became professor of theology at the University of Munich, where he spent the rest of his life. About this time he brought upon himself the criticism of Heinrich Heine, who was then editor of a Munich paper. The unsparing satirist described the professor's face as the "gloomiest" in the whole procession of ecclesiastics which took place on Good Friday.

In 1836 Döllinger made his first visit to England, and met a number of leading English intellectuals, including John Henry Newman and William Gladstone, with whom he maintained lifelong contact. For many years, a number of young Englishmen boarded with him in Munich and received direction in their studies; among them Lord Acton. Acton had been denied entry to the University of Cambridge because he was a Catholic, and subsequently went to Munich where he studied at the University and resided Döllinger's house. They became lifelong friends. Döllinger inspired in him a deep love of historical research and a profound conception of its functions as a critical instrument in the study of sociopolitical liberty.

In 1837 he was made member extraordinary of the Royal Bavarian Academy of Sciences, in 1843 a regular member, and from 1860 was secretary of its historical section.

In 1845, Döllinger was made representative of his university in the second chamber of the Bavarian legislature. In 1839 the king had given him a canonry in the royal chapel (Hofkollegiatstift) of St. Cajetan at Munich; and on 1 January 1847, he was made mitred provost or head of that body of canons. However, that same year he was dismissed from his chair, in punishment of his protest as representative of the university on the Bavarian Landtag, to which he had been appointed in 1844, against the dismissal of several university professors. In 1849 he was invited to occupy the chair of ecclesiastical history. In 1848, when nearly every throne in Europe was shaken by the spread of revolutionary sentiments, he was elected delegate to the national German assembly at Frankfurt. He spoke boldly in favour of freedom for the Church to manage her affairs without the interference of the state.

In 1857 Döllinger and Acton traveled to Rome, where they were both disenchanted with the direction of the papacy under Pius IX. Döllinger was also troubled that the Pope was the head of state of the Papal States. In some speeches at Munich in 1861 he outspokenly declared his view that the maintenance of the Roman Catholic Church did not depend on the temporal sovereignty of the pope. His book on The Church and the Churches (Munich, 1861) dealt to a certain extent with the same question.

In 1863 he invited 100 theologians to meet at Mechelen and discuss the question which the liberals Lamennais and Lacordaire had raised in France, namely, the attitude that should be assumed by the Roman Catholic Church towards modern ideas. In his address, “On the Past and Future of Catholic Theology”, Döllinger advocated for greater academic freedom.

Views

Protestantism
On the other hand, Döllinger published a treatise in 1838 against mixed marriages, and in 1843 wrote strongly in favour of requiring Protestant soldiers to kneel at the consecration of the Host when compelled officially to be present at Mass. Moreover, in his works on The Reformation (3 vols. Regensburg, 1846–1848) and on Luther (1851, Eng, tr., 1853) he is very severe on the Protestant leaders, and he also accepts, in his earlier works, the Ultramontane view then current on the practical condition of the Church of England, a view he later changed. Meanwhile, he had been well received in England; and he afterwards travelled in the Netherlands, Belgium and France, acquainting himself with the condition and prospects of the Roman Catholic Church. In 1842 he entered into correspondence with the leaders of the Tractarian movement in England, and some interesting letters have been preserved which were exchanged between him and Edward Pusey, William Ewart Gladstone and James Hope-Scott. When the last-named joined the Church of Rome he was warmly congratulated by Döllinger on the step he had taken.

Judaism
"The Jewish people moved in a circle of religious ideas only part of which were expressed in its sacred literature," wrote Döllinger.  "Far from being a dead letter in the hands of a people living in spiritual stagnation, [the Jews] were instinctually endowed with the power and the impulse to develop organically and steadily.  Tradition, on the one hand, and the religious condition of the whole nation, its whole history, on the other hand, acted and re-acted vigorously upon each other."  This favorable reference to the vigorous 'spirit' of Judaism runs counter to more common critiques of the religion expressed by 19th century theologians and counter-enlightenment thinkers.

Liberalism
It has been stated that in his earlier years Döllinger was a pronounced Ultramontane. This does not appear to have been altogether the case; for, very early in his professorial career at Munich, the Jesuits attacked his teaching of ecclesiastical history.  The celebrated Adam Möhler pronounced in Döllinger's favour, after which they became friends.  Döllinger also entered into relations with the well-known French Liberal Catholic Lamennais, whose views on the reconciliation of the Roman Catholic Church with the principles of modern society (liberalism) and the French Revolution had aroused much suspicion in Ultramontane, mainly Jesuit-dominated, circles. In 1832 Lammenais and his friends Lacordaire and Montalembert, visited Germany, obtaining considerable sympathy in their attempts to bring about a modification of the Roman Catholic attitude to modern problems and liberal political principles.

Döllinger also seems to have regarded favourably the removal, by the Bavarian government, in 1841, of Professor Kaiser from his chair, because he had taught the infallibility of the pope.

Papal authority

It has been said that Döllinger's change of attitude to the Papacy dated from the Italian war in 1859. It is more probable that, like Robert Grosseteste, he had been attached to the Papacy as the only centre of authority, and the only guarantee for public order in the Church, but that his experience of the actual working of the papal system (and especially a visit to Rome in 1857) had to a certain extent convinced him how his ideal diverged from the reality. Whatever his reasons, he ultimately became the leader of those who were energetically opposed to any addition to, or more stringent definition of, the powers of the Papacy.

The addresses delivered in the Catholic congress at Mechelen were a declaration in the direction of a Liberal solution of the problem of the relations of Church and State. Pius IX seemed to hesitate, but after four days' debate the assembly was ordered closed. On 8 December 1864 Pius IX issued the famous Syllabus Errorum, in which he declared war against liberalism and unbridled scientism. It was in connection with this question that Döllinger published his Past and Present of Catholic Theology (1863) and his Universities Past and Present (Munich, 1867).

Vatican Council and the Munich conference

It was about this time that some of the leading theologians of the Roman Catholic Church, wishing to define more clearly, the authority of the pope, advised Pius IX to declare Papal infallibity a dogma of the universal Church. There was not, however, a universal consensus on the subject; and some bishops, although not opposed, considered its promulgation to be inopportune. The headquarters of the opposition was Germany, and its leader was Döllinger. Among his supporters were his close friends Johann Friedrich and J. N. Huber, in Bavaria.
In the rest of Germany, Döllinger was supported by professors in the Catholic faculty of theology at Bonn, including the canonist Johann Friedrich von Schulte, Franz Heinrich Reusch, Joseph Langen, Joseph Hubert Reinkens, and other distinguished scholars. In Switzerland, Professor Eduard Herzog and other learned men supported the movement.

Early in 1869 the Letters of Janus (which were at once translated into English; 2nd ed. Das Papsttum, 1891) began to appear. They were written by Döllinger in conjunction with Huber and Friedrich. In these they disparaged the Syllabus and its incompatibility with modern thought. They argued that the concept of papal infallibility was intellectually indefensible, although their interpretation differed from what was proposed.

During the council, which convened on 8 December 1869, Augustin Theiner, the librarian at the Vatican, then in disgrace with the pope for his outspoken Liberalism, kept his German friends informed of the course of the discussions. The Letters of Quirinus, written by Döllinger and Huber concerning the proceedings appeared in the German newspapers, and an English translation was published by Charles Rivington.  The proceedings of the council were frequently stormy, and the opponents of the dogma of infallibility complained that they were interrupted, and that endeavours were made to put them down by clamour. The dogma was at length carried by an overwhelming majority, and the dissentient bishops, who – with the exception of two – had left the council before the final division, one by one submitted.

Döllinger headed a protest by forty-four professors in the University of Munich, and gathered together a congress at Munich, which met in August 1870 and issued a declaration adverse to the Vatican decrees. In Bavaria, where Döllinger's influence was greatest, a strong determination to resist the resolutions of the council prevailed.

But the authority of the council was held by the archbishop of Munich to be paramount, and he called upon Döllinger to submit. Instead of submitting, Döllinger, on 28 March 1871, addressed a memorable letter to the archbishop, refusing to subscribe the decrees. They were, he said, opposed to scripture, to the traditions of the Church for the first 1000 years, to historical evidence, to the decrees of the general councils, and to the existing relations of the Roman Catholic Church to the state in every country in the world. "As a Christian, as a theologian, as an historian, and as a citizen," he added, "I cannot accept this doctrine."

Excommunication
On 18 April 1871 Gregor von Scherr, Archbishop of Munich and Freising excommunicated Döllinger.

On 29 February 1871, Döllinger was elected rector-magnificus of the University of Munich by a vote of 54 to six. Several other universities conferred an honorary degree on him: Doctor of Civil Law, University of Oxford, 1871; Doctor of Laws, University of Edinburgh, 1872; Doctor of Law, University of Marburg; Doctor of Philosophy, University of Vienna.

The dissident Bavarian clergy invited Bishop Loos of the Old Catholic Church of the Netherlands, which for more than 150 years had existed independent of the Papacy, to administer the sacrament of Confirmation in Bavaria. The offer was accepted, and the bishop was received with triumphal arches and other demonstrations of joy by a part of the Bavarian Catholics. The three Dutch Old Catholic bishops declared themselves ready to consecrate a "non-infallibilist" bishop for Bavaria, if it were desired. The question was discussed at a meeting of the opponents of the Vatican Council's doctrine, and it was resolved to elect a bishop and ask the Dutch Old-Order bishops to consecrate him. Döllinger, however, voted against the proposition, and withdrew from any further steps towards the promotion of this movement.

The Old Catholic Church
Döllinger's refusal lost Bavaria to the movement; and the number of Bavarian sympathizers was still further reduced when the seceders, in 1878, allowed their priests to marry, a decision which Döllinger, as was known, sincerely regretted. The Old Catholic Communion, however, was formally constituted, with Joseph Hubert Reinkens at its head as bishop, and it still continues to exist in Germany as a whole and, more marginally, in Bavaria.

Döllinger's attitude to the new community was not very clearly defined. "I do not wish to join a schismatic society; I am isolated,". Döllinger's regularly insisted, his church remained the ancient Catholic Church, “the one holy catholic and apostolic church.”

Reunion conferences

His addresses on the reunion of the churches, delivered at the Bonn Conference of 1872, show that he was by no means hostile towards the newly formed Old Catholic communion, in whose interests these conferences were held. In 1874 and again in 1875, he presided over the reunion conferences held at Bonn and attended by leading ecclesiastics from the British Isles and from the Oriental non-Roman churches, among whom were Bishop Christopher Wordsworth of Lincoln; Bishop Harold Browne of Ely; Lord Plunket, Archbishop of Dublin; Lycurgus, Greek Orthodox Archbishop of Syros and Tenos; Canon Liddon; and the Russian Orthodox professor Ossmnine of St. Petersburg. At the latter of these two conferences, when Döllinger was 76 years of age, he delivered a series of addresses in German and English in which he discussed the state of theology on the continent, the reunion question and the religious condition of the various countries of Europe in which the Roman Catholic Church held sway. Not the least of his achievements on this occasion was the successful attempt, made with extraordinary tact, ability, knowledge and perseverance, to induce the Orientals, Anglicans and Old Catholics present to accept a formula of concord drawn from the writings of the leading theologians of the Greek Church on the long-vexed question of the procession of the Holy Spirit.

Scholarship in retirement

This result having been attained, he passed the rest of his days in retirement, emerging sometimes from his retreat to give addresses on theological questions, and also writing, in conjunction with his friend Reusch, his last book, Geschichte der Moralstreitigkeiten in der römisch-katholischen Kirche seit dem sechszehnten Jahrhundert mit Beiträgen zur Geschichte und Charakteristik des Jesuitenordens (Nördlingen, 1889), in which he deals with the moral theology of Alphonsus Liguori. He died in Munich at the age of ninety-one. Even in articulo mortis he refused to receive the sacraments from the parish priest at the cost of submission, but the last offices were performed by his friend Professor Friedrich. He is buried in the Alter Südfriedhof in Munich.

Works
 The Eucharist in the First Three Centuries (Mainz, 1826)
 A Church History (1836, Eng. trans. 1840)
 Hippolytus and Callistus (1854, Eng. trans., 1876)
 First Age of Christianity (1860)
 Lectures on the Reunion of the Churches
 The Vatican Decrees
 Studies in European History (tr. M. Warre, 1890)
 Miscellaneous Addresses (tr. M. Warre, 1894)

Bibliography
 Georg Denzler / Ernst Ludwig Grasmück (Eds.): Geschichtlichkeit und Glaube. Zum 100. Todestag Johann Joseph Ignaz von Döllingers (1799–1890). Munich Erich Wewel Verlag, 1990, 
 Stefan Leonhardt: "Zwei schlechthin unausgleichbare Auffassungen des Mittelpunktes der christliche Religion". Ignaz Döllingers Auseinandersetzung mit der Reformation, ihrer Lehre und deren Folgen in seiner ersten Schaffensperiode. Goettingen Edition Ruprecht, 2nd edition 2008, 
 Life by Johann Friedrich (3 vols. 1899–1901)
 Obituary notice in The Times, 11 January 1890
 L. von Kobell, Conversations of Dr Döllinger (tr. by K Gould, 1892)

Notes

References
 
 Döllinger, Johann Joseph Ignaz von Heidenthum und Judentum, Vorhalle zur Geschichte des Christenthums, page 819 [editor's translation, for a similar but slightly more archaic translation, see the Jewish Publication Society of America's 1900 translation of the same passage as quoted in Moritz Lazarus's Foundations of Jewish Ethics]
 Librett, Jeffrey S. Orientalism and the Figure of the Jew (Fordham University Press, 2014)

Further reading
 Dalberg-Acton, John (1861). "Döllinger's 'History of Christianity'," The Rambler, Vol. IV, pp. 145–175.
 Dalberg-Acton, John (1861). "Döllinger on the Temporal Power," The Rambler, Vol. VI, pp. 1–62.
 Dalberg-Acton, John (1867). "Döllinger on Universities," The Chronicle, Vol. XIII, pp. 57–59.
 Howard, Thomas Albert (2017). The Pope and the Professor: Pius IX, Ignaz von Dollinger, and the Quandary of the Modern Age. Oxford: Oxford University Press. 
 Marshall, Arthur F. (1890). "Dr. Döllinger and the 'Old Catholics'," The American Catholic Quarterly Review, Vol. XV, pp. 267–283.
 Strauss, Gerald (1975). "Success and Failure in the German Reformation," Past & Present, No. 67, pp. 30–63.
 Tonsor, S.J. (1959). "Ignaz von Döllinger: Lord Acton's Mentor," Anglican Theological Review, Vol. XLI, No. 2, pp. 211–215.
 Tonsor, S.J. (1959). "Lord Acton on Döllinger's Historical Theology," Journal of the History of Ideas, Vol. XX, pp. 329–352.

External links

 
 
 The Gentile and the Jew in the Courts of the Temple of Christ by Johann Joseph Ignaz von Döllinger
 Die Papst-Fabeln des Mittelalters by Johann Joseph Ignaz von Döllinger

1799 births
1890 deaths
People from Bamberg
19th-century German Roman Catholic priests
German untitled nobility
People excommunicated by the Catholic Church
German Old Catholic theologians
19th-century German theologians
Members of the Frankfurt Parliament
Members of the Bavarian Reichsrat
Members of the Bavarian Chamber of Deputies
University of Würzburg alumni
Liberal Catholicism
Academic staff of the Ludwig Maximilian University of Munich
19th-century German writers
Members of the Bavarian Academy of Sciences
19th-century German male writers
German male non-fiction writers
Burials at the Alter Südfriedhof